Raz Hershko (born 19 June 1998) is an Israeli judoka. She competed for Israel at the 2020 Summer Olympics.

Early life
Her uncle is Israeli-born former judoka and current Head coach of the Israel women's national judo team Shany Hershko.

She trains at the Wingate Institute in Netanya, Israel. She is openly lesbian.

Career
Hershko competes in the 78 kg and over weight category, and won a gold medal in the 2021 Antalya Grand Slam.

Earlier in her career, Hershko won the 2015 European U18 Judo Championships, as well as silver medals at the 2015 European Youth Summer Olympic Festival and the 2017 European U23 Championships and a bronze at the 2018 European U23 Championships.

Hershko represents Israel at the 2020 Summer Olympics, competing at the women's +78 kg weight category. Hershko won her first match with an ippon against the Saudi Tahani Alqahtani, advancing to the round of 16. There, she met the 2019 world champion – Japan's Akira Sone. Hershko lost to Sone, ending her part in the individual competition.

She won one of the bronze medals in her event at the 2022 Judo Grand Slam Tel Aviv held in Tel Aviv, Israel.

Titles
Source:

References

External links

 
 
 Raz Hershko at the European Judo Union
 

1998 births
Living people
Israeli female judoka
Jewish martial artists
Jewish Israeli sportspeople
Israeli Jews
Judoka at the 2020 Summer Olympics
Olympic judoka of Israel
Israeli LGBT sportspeople
Medalists at the 2020 Summer Olympics
Olympic medalists in judo
Olympic bronze medalists for Israel
20th-century Israeli women
21st-century Israeli women